Menace to Sobriety may refer to:

Menace to Sobriety (Ugly Kid Joe album), 1995
Menace to Sobriety (OPM album), 2000